
Gmina Podgórzyn is a rural gmina (administrative district) in Jelenia Góra County, Lower Silesian Voivodeship, in south-western Poland.

Neighbouring gminas
Gmina Podgórzyn is bordered by the towns of Jelenia Góra, Karpacz, Kowary and Piechowice and the gmina of Mysłakowice. It also borders the Czech Republic.

Villages
The gmina contains the villages of Borowice, Głębock, Marczyce, Miłków, Podgórzyn, Przesieka, Ściegny, Sosnówka, Staniszów and Zachełmie.

Twin towns – sister cities

Gmina Podgórzyn is twinned with:
 Desná, Czech Republic
 Górzyca, Poland
 Schirgiswalde-Kirschau, Germany
 Smołdzino, Poland
 Špindlerův Mlýn, Czech Republic

References

Podgorzyn
Karkonosze County